Fabiola Ramírez (born 19 January 1990) is a Mexican Paralympic swimmer. She represented Mexico at the 2020 Summer Paralympics in the women's 100 metre backstroke S2 event and won a bronze medal.

References

1990 births
Living people
Medalists at the 2011 Parapan American Games
Paralympic swimmers of Mexico
Swimmers at the 2008 Summer Paralympics
Swimmers at the 2012 Summer Paralympics
Swimmers at the 2020 Summer Paralympics
Medalists at the 2020 Summer Paralympics
Paralympic bronze medalists for Mexico
Paralympic medalists in swimming
Sportspeople from Aguascalientes
Mexican female backstroke swimmers
Mexican female breaststroke swimmers
S2-classified Paralympic swimmers
20th-century Mexican women
21st-century Mexican women